The Prince's Lines are part of the fortifications of Gibraltar, situated on the lower slopes of the north-west face of the Rock of Gibraltar. The lines face out across the modern Laguna Estate, which stands on the site of the Inundation, an artificial lake created to obstruct landward access to Gibraltar. They were constructed to enfilade attackers approaching Gibraltar's Landport Front from the landward direction.

A fortification constructed by the Spanish or Moors appears to have existed on the site before the British capture of Gibraltar in 1704, but the Lines were principally constructed during the 18th century. They were first laid out in 1720, and a stone stepped communication passage was later built to connect them with the Queen's Lines. William Green carried out major improvements after 1761, repairing the parapets, scarping the cliff, repairing the banquets and parapets and smoothing the ditches with mortar. To prevent shells and rubble rolling into the Lines from behind, dry rubble walls were constructed to their rear. The glacis in front of the Lines was also cleared of boulders and crevices were infilled to deny enemy soldiers any shelter. A bombproof barracks, magazine and cookhouse were built at the same time. During the construction of the Lines, an "entire human skeleton" was discovered fossilised in the rock but was blown to pieces by a miner. Nothing else is recorded about this find, but only a few decades later, the first known Neanderthal skull was found nearby.

The Lines saw action during the Thirteenth Siege of Gibraltar (1726–27), when they mounted two cannon and several swivel guns which were reported to have caused heavy casualties among the attacking Spanish force. During the Anglo-Spanish War of 1761–63, they mounted two 9-pdrs and five 6-pdrs, and by 1770 they could accommodate up to fifty wall-mounted guns using sockets cut into the eastern end of the parapet's crest. A communication gallery was cut in 1790. The Lines were bombarded again during the Great Siege of Gibraltar (1779–83). On 11 June 1782, a Spanish shell exploded inside the magazine of Princess Anne's Battery further up the Rock, causing a massive explosion that blew the flank of the battery into the Prince's Lines, killing fourteen soldiers.

Hanover Battery stands at the west end of the Lines. At the eastern end of the Lines are Lower Forbes Battery and Prince's Lines Battery, which was repurposed during the Second World War to mount a searchlight housed inside a cantilevered iron cupola. The parapet of the Lines was raised during the war to provide loopholes for rifles, with a second wall added behind and the space roofed over with concrete. The Lines are still mostly intact but have been abandoned and are now in a state of overgrown disrepair.

References

Bibliography

 
 
 
 
 

Fortifications in Gibraltar